The San Diego State Aztecs women's swimming and diving team represents San Diego State University in NCAA Division I intercollegiate women's swimming and diving competition. The Aztecs currently compete in the Mountain West Conference. The team's home pool in the Aztec Aquaplex, a facility opened in 2007 on the SDSU campus.

Postseason
The Aztecs have reached the NCAA Division I Women's Swimming and Diving Championships 8 times since becoming a varsity program.

See also
 Aztec Hall of Fame

References

External links 
 

San Diego State Aztecs
Mountain West Conference swimming and diving
College swim teams in the United States
Women's sports in California